Holzminden is a town in southern Lower Saxony, Germany. It is the capital of the district of Holzminden. It is located on the river Weser, which at this point forms the border with the state of North Rhine-Westphalia.

History

Holzminden is first mentioned in the 9th century as Holtesmeni. However, the name did not at this time refer to the present city, but to the village of Altendorf, the "old village", which was incorporated into the city in 1922.

During the reign of Louis the Pious (814–840), monks from the Abbey of Corbie in France came to this part of Germany and founded a daughter house at Hethis in the Solling. As it became clear that this site was unviable (owing to lack of access to water) it was abandoned, and a new monastery, Corbeia nova (Corvey Abbey), opened close to the river. Old documents show that many pious donations were given to the Holtesmeni (monastery).

The settlement is believed to have come into being, along with other settlements in the vicinity, in the 6th-7th centuries. Other villages were subsequently abandoned as Holzminden was granted municipal liberties, allowing greater privileges to its inhabitants, and attracting new settlers from the surrounding hinterland.

In 1200, the town was brought under the protection of the prince's castle of Everstein, and by 1245 it had received a charter. This was granted by the count of Everstein. The town's coat of arms shows the Everstein lion rampant within the open town gate.

From 1408, the town belonged to the Welfen princes; and from the 16th century to the princes of Brunswick of the Wolfenbüttel line. From the 16th century until 1942, Holzminden therefore lay within Brunswick-Lüneburg.

In 1640, during the Thirty Years' War, the town was destroyed by the Imperial troops, a blow from which it only slowly recovered. Until the 20th century Holzminden remained a provincial town of small farmers and holdings.

During World War I, Holzminden was the site of a large civilian internment camp on the outskirts of the town, which held up to 10,000 Polish, Russian, Belgian and French nationals, including women and children (1914–1918); and also of a smaller prisoner-of-war camp for captured British and British Empire officers (1917–1918).

Economy

Crafts and farming have long ceased to be the main town's sources of income. Holzminden is now a largely industrial town.

In the late 19th century, Dr. Wilhelm Haarmann began developing the scent and flavours industry. In 1874, with Ferdinand Tiemann, he succeeded in synthesising vanillin from coniferyl alcohol. More products were subsequently developed. The modern successor of their enterprise is the Symrise factory: Holzminden is a centre of the flavour and fragrance ingredient industry, its products being used throughout the world in cosmetic and food manufacture.

The large Stiebel Eltron company, which produces heating and hot water products, has its headquarters in Holzminden.

Owens-Illinois operates a glassworks in the town.

Religion
As a part of the former territory of Brunswick, Holzminden maintains a Protestant tradition. The church of St. Pauls in Altendorf, dating from before 1200, is the oldest of the town's churches. In its unadorned simplicity it offers a serene place for rest and contemplation. Other churches in the town are named after Luther, St. Michael, St. Thomas and St. Joseph(catholic).

Sights

The Tilly House of 1609 is located on the Johannis Square. It has a fine Renaissance door, which survived the fires of the Thirty Years' War. Johann Tserclaes, Count of Tilly, commander of the Imperial forces, is said to have spent a night here.

The Reichspräsidentenhaus links the old part of the town with the Hafendamm and was opened in 1929. The beautiful Glockenspiel (carillon) is very popular, and plays well known tunes at set times.

The steeple of the Lutheran church has become a symbol of Holzminden. The interior was remodelled in 1577, when it was made into a two-room church.

The Severinsche Haus is a richly decorated house dating from 1683. It is the largest of the bourgeois houses, is decorated with a distinctive weathercock, and is known for its slanting floors.

There is a good viewing platform on the Emperor William Tower, south of the town.

Museums
 The town museum
 The doll and toy museum (private)

Educational institutions
 HAWK, the Hochschule für angewandte Wissenschaft und Kunst, was founded in 1831/32 by Friedrich Ludwig Haarmann as the first college of architecture in Germany. The Bauschule is now a prominent feature of the town, and many student activities, such as the traditional master's procession, are regular events on the Holzminden calendar.
 LSH, the Internat Solling, is a private boarding school founded in 1909 as part of an educational reform movement that sought to cultivate "Mind, Heart and Hand" equally. The campus occupies large parklike grounds on a western slope of the Solling.
 Campe-Gymnasium. A Gymnasium is a top school for strongly emphasizes academic learning and comparable to the British grammar school system or with prep schools in the United States. 
 The other secondary schools are the Dr. Jasper-Realschule and the Johannes-Falk-Schule (Hauptschule).
 There are also a Förderschule, Schule an der Weser and Anne-Frank-Schule.

International relations

Holzminden is twinned with:
  Leven, Fife, Scotland

Notable people
 Erwin Böhme (1879–1917), World War I flying ace
 Ulrich Brinkhoff (born 1940), Photographer and writer
 Carl Wilhelm Gerberding (1894–1984), industrialist and founder of Dragoco
 :de:August Hampe (1866–1945), politician, Minister of Justice of the Braunschweig District
 Adolf Heusinger (1897–1982), German general and Chairman of the NATO Military Committee
 :de:Eberhard Itzenplitz (1926–2012), film director
 Leopold Scherman (died 1970), architect

Other notable people who have lived in Holzminden
 Jyhan Artut (born 1976), darts player 
 Jonatan Briel (1942–1988), film director and actor
 Robert Bunsen (1811–1899), chemist
 Niels Jannasch (1924–2001), mariner, curator and maritime historian
 Nicolas Kiefer (born 1977), tennis player
 Christian Meyer (born 1975), politician for the Alliance '90/The Greens and Minister of Lower Saxony
 Wilhelm Konrad Hermann Müller (1812–1890), a philologist of Germanic studies
 Wilhelm Raabe (1831–1910), novelist
 Annika Roloff (born 1991), athlete who specializes in the pole vault
 Carola Roloff (born 1959), Buddhist nun, Tibetologist, University Professor
 Uwe Schünemann (born 1964), CDU politician and Minister of Lower Saxony
 Meinolf Sellmann, computer scientist
 Generaloberst Nikolaus von Falkenhorst (1885–1968), Convicted war criminal. Did not follow the Commando Order. Guilty on 8 other charges
 Prince Wilhelm-Karl of Prussia (1922–2007)
 Heinz H. Weissenstein (1912–1996), photographer

See also
 Holzminden internment camp
 Holzminden prisoner-of-war camp
 Holzminden (district)
 Metropolitan region Hannover-Braunschweig-Göttingen-Wolfsburg

References

External links
 Holzminden homepage

Holzminden (district)
Duchy of Brunswick